The 2022 FC Cincinnati 2 season is the inaugural season of FC Cincinnati 2, the reserve team of Major League Soccer club FC Cincinnati. FC Cincinnati 2 competes in MLS Next Pro, a professional developmental league in the third tier of the United States soccer league system.

Players and staff

Current roster

Staff 
 Tyrone Marshall – Head coach
 Ryan Coulter – Goalkeepers coach

Competitions

MLS Next Pro

Standings 
Eastern Conference

Overall table

Results summary

Results

See also 
2022 FC Cincinnati season

References

FC Cincinnati 2
FC Cincinnati 2
FC Cincinnati 2
FC Cincinnati 2